Abass Ibrahim (born 10 August 1988) is a Saudi pop singer. He has released three albums on EMI Records. 

He was discovered by composer Sami Ehsan.

Albums
2002: اسمعوني (Hear me)
2003: ناديت (I called)
2004: حبيبي (My Love)
2005: لفته (Gesture)
2008: منت فاهم (you don't understand)
2010: أنا غنيت (I sing)
2019 : زاهية (Bright)

Singles
2006: الساعة 25 (Twenty-five O'clock )
2010: ماني على خبرك (I'm not like I used to)
2011: كيف حالك (How are you)

Music series
2006 اسوار (Walls)
2008 اسوار (Walls II)

References

External links
Biography of Abbas Ibrahim
Abass Ibrahim Songs
eTarab – Abass Ibrahim

21st-century Saudi Arabian male singers
Living people
1988 births
People from Jeddah